Breath Savers is a brand of mint manufactured by the Hershey Company.

History 
Breath Savers were introduced in 1973 by the Life Savers Company, a division of E.R. Squibb, in limited areas, and were originally sugared. The brand became a national brand in 1978 when it replaced sugar with saccharin and became sugar-free from then on. Nabisco acquired the Life Savers Company from E.R. Squibb in 1981.  In 2000, after its merger with Kraft Foods, Nabisco sold its gum and breath mint business to Hershey.

Product & Packaging  

As the name and design suggests, Breath Savers are modeled after Life Savers, beveled at the outer edges and having a shallow depression in the center, on both sides. Each Breath Saver is counterembossed on one side with the legend "BREATH SAVER" in raised letters about 0.3 mm high in a circular pattern around the center. They are packaged in three ways:
A cylindrical roll, with 12 mints in each roll.
In a disc-shaped plastic tin, sold as "Breath Savers 3 Hour Mints".
In an oblong container, sold as "Breath Savers Protect". This is a deposit mint made of 99% xylitol.

Ingredients 
The main ingredient found in Breath Savers is sorbitol, found naturally in found naturally in some fruits, including apples, apricots, dates, berries and peaches, it is a sugar alcohol containing one-third the calories of sugar and which is 60 times sweeter than sugar. In addition to sorbitol, Breath Savers also contains small amounts of aspartame and natural flavors.

Breath Savers have also begun advertising some of their mints to contain sodium bicarbonate, an alkaline salt used in many personal hygiene products as a mechanical cleanser on the teeth and gums. It also neutralizes the production of acid in the mouth, and acts as an antiseptic to help prevent infections.

See also
 Life Savers, a similar candy available in mint
 Polo Mints
 List of breath mints

References

External links
Breath Savers official web site
Slate magazine review of common breath mints (including Breath Savers)

Breath mints
American confectionery
Brand name confectionery
Products introduced in 1973
The Hershey Company brands